The 1922 Rutgers Queensmen football team represented Rutgers University as an independent during the 1922 college football season. In their 10th season under head coach George Sanford, the Queensmen compiled a 5–4 record and outscored their opponents, 133 to 117. Coach Sanford was inducted into the College Football Hall of Fame in 1971.

Schedule

References

Rutgers
Rutgers Scarlet Knights football seasons
Rutgers Queensmen football